This is a list of schools in Windsor and Maidenhead in the English county of Berkshire.

State-funded schools

Primary schools

Alexander First School, Oakley Green
All Saints CE Junior School, Maidenhead
Alwyn Infant School, Maidenhead
Bisham CE Academy, Bisham
Boyne Hill CE Infant School, Maidenhead
Braywick Court School, Maidenhead
Braywood CE First School, Oakley Green
Burchetts Green CE Infants' School, Burchetts Green
Cheapside CE Primary School, Cheapside
Clewer Green CE First School, Windsor
Cookham Dean CE Primary School, Cookham Dean
Cookham Rise Primary School, Cookham Rise
Courthouse Junior School, Maidenhead
Datchet St Mary's CE Primary School, Datchet
Dedworth Green First School, Windsor
Eton Porny CE First School, Eton
Eton Wick CE First School, Eton Wick
Furze Platt Infant School, Maidenhead
Furze Platt Junior School, Maidenhead
Hilltop First School, Windsor
Holy Trinity CE Primary School, Cookham
Holy Trinity CE Primary School, Sunningdale
Holyport CE Primary School, Holyport
Homer First School, Windsor
King's Court First School, Old Windsor
Knowl Hill CE Primary Academy, Knowl Hill
Larchfield Primary School, Maidenhead
Lowbrook Academy, Cox Green
Oakfield First School, Windsor
Oldfield Primary School, Maidenhead
The Queen Anne Royal Free CE First School, Windsor
Riverside Primary School, Maidenhead
The Royal First School, Windsor
St Edmund Campion RC Primary School, Maidenhead
St Edward's RC First School, Windsor
St Francis RC Primary School, Ascot
St Luke's CE Primary School, Maidenhead
St Mary's RC Primary School, Maidenhead
St Michael's CE Primary School, Sunninghill
South Ascot Village Primary School, Ascot
Trinity St Stephen CE First School, Windsor
Waltham St Lawrence Primary School, Waltham St Lawrence
Wessex Primary School, Cox Green
White Waltham CE Academy, White Waltham
Woodlands Park Primary School, Woodlands Park
Wraysbury Primary School, Wraysbury

Middle schools
 Dedworth Middle School, Windsor
 St Edward's Royal Free Ecumenical Middle School, Windsor
 St Peter's CE Middle School, Old Windsor
 Trevelyan Middle School, Windsor

Secondary and upper schools

 Altwood Church of England School, Maidenhead
 Charters School, Sunningdale
 Churchmead School, Datchet
 Cox Green School, Maidenhead
 Desborough College, Maidenhead
 Furze Platt Senior School, Maidenhead
 Holyport College, Holyport
 Newlands Girls' School, Maidenhead
 The Windsor Boys' School, Windsor
 Windsor Girls' School, Windsor

Special and alternative schools
Forest Bridge School, Maidenhead
Manor Green School, Maidenhead
RBWM Alternative Learning Provision, Maidenhead

Further education
Berkshire College of Agriculture, Burchetts Green
East Berkshire College, Windsor

Independent schools

Primary and preparatory schools

Eton End School, Datchet
Herries Preparatory School, Cookham Dean
Highfield Preparatory School, Maidenhead
The King's House School, Windsor
Papplewick School, Ascot
St George's School, Windsor
St John's Beaumont School, Old Windsor
St Piran's, Maidenhead
Sunningdale School, Sunningdale
Upton House School, Windsor

Senior and all-through schools
Claires Court School, Maidenhead
Eton College, Eton
The Marist School, Sunninghill
St George's School, Ascot
St Mary's School, Ascot

Special and alternative schools
Beech Lodge School, Hurley
The Green Room, Windsor
Heathermount School, Ascot
Huntercombe Hospital School, Maidenhead
Queensmead House School, Windsor

External links
Schools - Royal Borough of Windsor and Maidenhead Council

Windsor and Maidenhead
Schools in the Royal Borough of Windsor and Maidenhead
School